is a Japanese television presenter, and formerly an actress, model, and member of the Japanese idol group Canary Club. She played the role of Moune/GoseiYellow in the thirty-fourth Super Sentai series Tensou Sentai Goseiger, and appeared in the 2011 film Cheerfu11y. From 2011 to 2013 Niwa was a regular model for the magazine SEDA. In 2013 she became a weather presenter on the Nippon TV morning programme Zip!.

In November 2016 Niwa announced her marriage to a fellow NTV presenter.

References 

1989 births
Living people
People from Aichi Prefecture
Japanese gravure idols
Japanese female models
Musicians from Aichi Prefecture
Nice Girl Project!
Actors from Aichi Prefecture